Anak Langit (English: Sky Kids) is an Indonesian television series produced by SinemArt which premiered on 20 February 2017, on SCTV.<ref>{{Cite web |title=SCTV Siap Tayangkan Anak sekolahan dan Anak' Langit 20 Februari|url=https://www.bintang.com/saya-di-sctv/read/2850431/sctv-siap-tayangkan-anak-sekolahan-dan-anak-langit-.html |website=Bintang.com}}</ref> The soap opera, which is the fourth longest Indonesian soap opera based on the number of episodes, was directed by Akbar Bhakti and starred Stefan William, Marcella Daryanani, and Hana Saraswati. At the end of March 2020, this soap opera was temporarily suspended due to the COVID-19 pandemic in Indonesia until it finally ended with episode 1560 on 29 March 2020.

 Plot 
Al (Ammar Zoni), Andra (Immanuel Caesar Hito), and Key (Cemal Faruk) live at the Orphanage owned by Babe Rozak (Fathir Muchtar) and Nyak Ida (Mega Aulia). The three of them have different personalities, but complement each other. They are members of a motorcycle gang, Rainbow.

One of the members of Rainbow named Reno (Juan Christian) who had died entrusting his younger brother, Vika (Ranty Maria) to Al. As time goes by, Al puts his heart on Vika. However, Rimba (Dylan Carr) who is the leader of the motorcycle gang Anthrax'', who is none other than Al's biggest enemy, tries to win Vika's heart.

Cast 
Stefan William	as Hiro
Marcella Daryanani	as Afni Ayu Lestari (Tari)
Hana Saraswati as	Sasya
Anthony Xie	as Toni
Gerald Yo as	Gerry
Mario Maulana	as Robert Chaniago
Raya Kitty as	Eva Monita (Emon)/Mocca
Fathir Muchtar as	Rozak
Fera Feriska as	Dedeh
Umar Lubis	as Junaedi
Devi Permatasari as	Irene
Angga Putra as	Jaelani
Leon Dozan as	Asep
Mezty Mez as Alis
Benny Ruswandi as Kohar
Henny Timbul as Astri (Aci)
Sasha Alexa	as Merry
Merry Mustaf as	Leha
Adipura as Hariman
Aldo Bamar as Agil
Siska Magdalena as	Rohaya
Firman Maliksyah asToha
Audi Marissa as Marissa
Fanny Fadillah	as Ucup
Cassandra Lee as	Selina
George Rudy as Dani
Fendy Pradana as Darko
Kevin Kambey as Jefri
Natalie Zenn as Tasya
Esta Pramanita	as Ayumi
Ije Kurniawan	as Evan
Teuku Anwar as	Axel
Willy Dozan as Billy
Ammar Zoni	as Al/Ali
Nasya Marcella as Milka Ayu Kinasih/Maira
Immanuel Caesar Hito as Andra
Cemal Faruk as	Key Salahuddin
Dylan Carr	as Rimba
Ranty Maria as Vika
Mischa Chandrawinata as	Erland/Edward
Angela Gilsha	as Finny
Ari Wibowo as	Wibowo
Yoelitta Palar	as Yulita
Anjasmara as	Reza
Mega Aulia as	Farida
Michella Putri	as Putri
Bryan Domani as Endro Jorgy (Enjoy)
Yabes Yosia	as Alvino
Erdin Werdrayana Wijaya as 	Erdin
Thoriq Hafidz	as Arick
Binyo Sungkar	as Salim
Soyfarn Zoel as	Mang Kirun
Yanah	as Bi Aah
Imelda Lubis as	Maya
Anggie Miraclle	 as Anggie
Sabina Katya	as Mawar
Sri Devi	as Uli
Fauzan Riado	as Ibes
Ali Zainal Abidin Aljufri as	Joe
Aldy Dava as	Hendro
Billiand Wekan	as Bono
Zoel Pandjoul	as Kibo
Steven Tanady	as Bobby
Abdon Yonata as Tedjo
Raffel Jordy as Boeng
Yuditia Winanda	Yudit
Macho Virgonta as	Eka/Saka
Rasyid Karim as	Ramli
Alvin Smith as Anak Geng Black Skull
Fikri Aziz	as Beni
Dede Wijaya	as Tama
Mario Bayu	as Mario
Nando Hilmy	as Nando
Yogi Tama	as Troy
Cevi	as Momo
Martin Immanuel as	Yoga/Martin
Irish Hutasoit as	Iris
Emiliano Fernando Cortizo	as Rivaldo
Kevin Hillers as Rey
James Thomas as Bara
Hud Filbert as	Bima
Latief Sitepu	as Dhalim
Debby Cynthia Dewi as	Dewi
Aditya Zoni as	Omar
Panji Zoni	as Aji
Zoe Abbas Jackson as	Adel
Verrell Bramasta as	Satria
Ochi Rosdiana as	Diana Dewi (Dee-Dee)
Maureen Daryanani	as Heli
Juan Christian	as Reno
Philip de May as	Debrongs
Agatha Valerie as	Anissa
Volland Humonggio as	Volland
Ikbal Fauzi	as Vito
Ichal Muhammad	as Bimo
Evan Marvino	as Evan
Irwan Chandra	as Alonso
Reymon Knuliqh as Froz
Triningtyas	as Astuti
Rudy Kawilarang	 as Bedok
Rangga Azof	as Niko
Rexy Rizky	 as Dilon
Zack Lee as Zacky
Renald Ramadhan	 as Rama
Dinda Hauw as	Asma
Cut Meyriska	as Adinda/Amanda
Ivan Fadilla	as Baskara
Devi Lanni	as Cantika
Sandy Pradana	as Sandy
Rifat Darwis	as Rifat
Robert Chaniago	as Izzy
Rezna Thawaffie	as Roni
Alex Rio	as Edho
Sylvia Pudjoningsih	as Dina
Nadien Natasha	as Cici
Naufal Alnauf	as Riko
Nolvia Elsya	as Nengsi
Lady Bella Anjani as Sierra
Vivi Alatas as	Vivi
Bobby Saleh Malik	as Kang Deden
Kintaan Mary	as Intan
Aksa Aufa Arsyka	as Otong
Dipo Krueger	as Rizki
Jho Rizki	as Wilman
Michael Cello	as Erik
Marie Cordry	as Keysha
Mega Regina	as Bonita
Della	as Della
Sonia Subnita	as Sonia
Divania Nadhira	as Ratna
Yonathan Efraim	as Boim
Giesta Restu Fajriani	as Putri
Rafkha Kivlan Alfarizi as	Yan
Erick Fecky	as Bondan
Syarifadiya	as Ana
Agus Wibowo	as Ayah Yulita
Bella Kuku Tanesia	as Dini
Daniel Bond	as Satpam

Theme song 

Keterangan

Catatan

Awards and nominations

References

External links 
  Situs Website SinemArt
 Production website

2017 Indonesian television series debuts
Musical television soap operas
Indonesian comedy television series
Indonesian drama television series
Indonesian television soap operas
2010s Indonesian television series
2010s television soap operas